Georges Casimir Semelaignes (2 November 1853 – 27 August 1924) was a French fencer. He competed in the men's sabre event at the 1900 Summer Olympics.

References

External links
 

1853 births
1924 deaths
French male sabre fencers
Olympic fencers of France
Fencers at the 1900 Summer Olympics
Sportspeople from Neuilly-sur-Seine